This is a list of governors of Alagoas.

Rulers of the colonial period (1817 — 1822) 
The captaincy of Alagoas was created on September 16, 1817, splitting off from the captaincy of Pernambuco, whose governor commanded it until 1819. On February 28, 1821, all captaincies in Brazil were renamed "provinces".

Rulers of the Imperial Period (1822 - 1889) 
Legenda

Rulers of the Republic (1889 — )

References

Footlist

Governors of Alagoas
Lists of Brazilian state governors